The 2014 FIBA Africa Women's Clubs Champions Cup (20th edition), was an international basketball tournament that took place at the Salle Olympique Raed Bejaoui, in Sfax, Tunisia, from November 28 to December 7, 2014. The tournament, organized by FIBA Africa and hosted by Club Sportif Sfaxien, was contested by 9 teams split into 2 groups, the first four of each group qualifying for the knock-out stage (quarter, semis and final).
 
The tournament was won by Interclube from Angola.

Draw

Squads

Preliminary rounds

Times given below are in UTC+1.

Group A

Group B

Knockout stage

Quarter-finals

5th-8th place

Semifinals

7th place

5th place

Bronze medal game

Gold medal game

Final standings

Interclube rosterAngelina Golome, Astrida Vicente, Elsa Eduardo, Luzia Simão, Felizarda Jorge, Italee Lucas, Luzia Simão, Merciana Fernandes, Nadir Manuel, Ngiendula Filipe, Rosemira Daniel, Sequoia Holmes Coach: Manuel Sousa

Statistical Leaders

Individual Tournament Highs

Points

Rebounds

Assists

Steals

Blocks

Turnovers

2-point field goal percentage

3-point field goal percentage

Free throw percentage

Individual Game Highs

Team Tournament Highs

Points

Rebounds

Assists

Steals

Blocks

Turnovers

2-point field goal percentage

3-point field goal percentage

Free throw percentage

Team Game highs

All Tournament Team

See also
 2013 FIBA Africa Championship for Women

References

External links 
 Official Website
 FIBA Africa official website

2014 FIBA Africa Women's Clubs Champions Cup
Women's Clubs Champions Cup
Africa Women's Clubs Champions Cup
FIBA
FIBA Africa Women's Clubs Champions Cup
FIBA Africa Women's Clubs Champions Cup